The  Miss Louisiana USA competition is the pageant that selects the representative for the state of Louisiana in the Miss USA pageant.

Miss Louisiana USA is produced by RPM Productions since 1990, which also produces the Miss USA and Miss Teen USA state pageants for Alabama, North Carolina, and South Carolina. RPM Productions' headquarters is in Aiken, South Carolina.

Sylvia Masters of Houma, Louisiana was crowned Miss Louisiana USA 2023 on February 4, 2023, at Jefferson Performing Arts Center in Metairie. She will represent Louisiana at Miss USA 2023.

History
Louisiana is one of only seven states to have three or more Miss USA winners (in 1958, 1961, and 1996).

Four Miss Louisiana USA titleholders previously held the Miss Louisiana Teen USA title, including Ali Landry, who became the third woman from Louisiana to be crowned Miss USA.

Jennifer Dupont, Miss Louisiana USA 2000, is one of only seven women who have competed in the Miss Teen USA, Miss USA and Miss America pageants.

Louisiana's future success at Miss USA would be evident in the state's first contestant, Jeanne Vaughn Thompson, Miss Louisiana USA 1952 and 1953. She is the only woman to ever compete twice in the history of Miss USA, and to outright win a Miss USA state title twice.

Thompson was also the only two-time state titleholder in Miss USA history, a record she held for 44 years until Shanna Lyn Searles became the second and only other double state titleholder.  Searles won the Miss California USA title outright in 1996 after inheriting the state's 1992 title due to the original winner, Shannon Marketic, being crowned Miss USA 1992.

Thompson's overall pageant success includes winning the Miss Louisiana state title and competing at Miss America in 1951, winning the first two Miss Louisiana USA state titles and competing in the first and second Miss USA pageants, becoming the first-ever 1st runner-up in 1952 and a semi-finalist and Miss Congeniality (Amity) winner in 1953. Her two consecutive participations in Miss USA and subsequent final placements prompted organizers to create a rule allowing a person to compete for the title only once.

Miss Louisiana USA contestants accomplished another feat first, winning both the Miss Congeniality (Amity) and Miss Photogenic awards ever given to a Miss USA state delegate. Thompson was the winner of the Miss Congeniality award given to the first Miss USA state contestant in 1953.

The second Miss Congeniality award given also went to another contestant from Louisiana, Judy Fletcher in 1960.  That year, during the era when both Miss USA and Miss Universe pageants were held at the same time, Fletcher tied with a Miss Universe contestant from Myanmar (known at the time as Burma) for the award.

Sharon Brown, who represented Louisiana in 1961, won the first Miss Photogenic award given to a Miss USA state delegate. She also won the Miss USA title, the first Miss Photogenic winner to obtain that feat.

Louisiana is one of only two states (California the other) to have won both the Miss USA title and the Miss Photogenic award in the same year on two separate occasions (Brown in 1961 and Landry in 1996).

Gallery of titleholders

Results summary

Placements
Miss USAs: Eurlyne Howell (1958), Sharon Brown (1961), Ali Landry (1996)
1st runners-up: Jeanne Thompson (1952)
2nd runners-up: Lisa Lynn Moss (1981)
3rd runners-up: Kathy Hebert (1968), Pamela Forrest (1983), Sarie Joubert (1985), Elizabeth Primm (1989), Brittany Guidry (2014)
4th runners-up: Robyn Sanders (1976)
Top 6: Shirelle Hebert (1994), Elizabeth Coxe (1995)
Top 10/11/12: Bonnie Martin (1972), Storm Hensley (1973), Karen Hoff (1974), Christy Saylor (1992), Debbie Delhomme (1998), Anne-Katherine Lene (2002), Kristen Girault (2013), Candice Bennatt (2015)
Top 15/16/20: Jeanne Thompson (1953), Mary Lobianco (1959), Judy Fletcher (1960), Elizabeth McNulty (2007), Erin Edmiston (2012), Victoria Paul (2019), Mariah Clayton (2020), Tanya Crowe (2021)

Louisiana holds a record of 29 placements at Miss USA.

Awards
Miss Photogenic: Sharon Brown (1961), Kathy Hebert (1968), Elizabeth Primm (1989), Ali Landry (1996)
Miss Congeniality: Jeanne Thompson (1953), Judy Fletcher (1960)
Best State Costume: 2nd Place: Elizabeth Primm (1989)

Winners

Color key

1 Age at the time of the Miss USA pageant

References

External links
Official website

Louisiana
Louisiana culture
Women in Louisiana
Recurring events established in 1952
1952 establishments in Louisiana
Annual events in Louisiana